The Stora Lundby Ladies Open was a women's professional golf tournament on the Swedish Golf Tour played between 1987 and 1991. It was always held at Stora Lundby Golf Club in Gråbo, Sweden.

Winners

References

Swedish Golf Tour (women) events
Golf tournaments in Sweden
Defunct sports competitions in Sweden
Recurring sporting events established in 1987
Recurring sporting events disestablished in 1991